= Binary galaxy =

Two galaxies orbiting each other

A binary galaxy is a system of two interacting galaxies where their distance is 5-10 times less than the distance of the nearest galaxies of comparable brightness and dimension. The orbital periods of these galaxies are typically in the timescales of hundreds of millions of years. The Milky Way galaxy and the nearest galaxy, Andromeda Galaxy may be classed as a binary galaxy.

Milky Way and Andromeda galaxies are thought to be binary galaxies.

Binary galaxies, if spaced out a large distance, can be stable. However close pairs of galaxies can cause disruptions to their structures. They can also merge and become an interacting galaxy.

These pairs of galaxies are useful in the field of astronomy to determine the mass of galaxies.
